Ángel Javier Velásquez Quesquén (born 12 March 1960) is a Peruvian lawyer and politician. A prominent member of the Peruvian Aprista Party, he has served in Congress between 2001 and 2019, previously serving from 1995 to 2000. In Alan García's second presidency, Velásquez was sworn as the third Prime Minister of Peru of the administration, succeeding Yehude Simon in 2009. He resigned his post in 2010 with the intention to run for the Peruvian Aprista Party presidential nomination later that year. Although not selected as the nominee, he was part of the presidential ticket of Mercedes Aráoz in which he was the candidate for First Vice President until her withdrawal from the election in January 2011. In 2016, he was reelected for a fifth term in Congress, representing the Lambayeque Region under the Popular Alliance which consisted of the APRA and PPC.

Law career
In 1987, Velásquez graduated with a law degree from the National University Pedro Ruiz Gallo. Since that year, he has been a designate lecturer at the Higher Institute of Technology "República Federal de Alemania" in Chiclayo. From 1991 to 1992, he was head of the public register of the North Eastern region of Marañón. From 1997 to 2003 he additionally studied for a Master of Laws, focusing on Constitutional law at the Pontifical Catholic University of Peru. Velásquez was a lecturer (Professor) at the Private University Chiclayo in 2000/2001 and at the University of San Martín de Porres in 2006 and in 2007/2008, teaching constitutional law.

Currently he is studying to obtain a Ph.D. in Law from National University of San Marcos in Lima.

Political career

Early political career 
Javier Velásquez started his career in the social-democratic Peruvian Aprista Party, serving as Secretary General of the Party's base in Lambayeque from 1992 to 1994.

Congressman 
In the 1995 elections, he was elected to the Congress for his first five-year term, but failed to attain reelection in the 2000 elections. In the 2001 elections, after a brief one-year absence, he returned to Congress and was  re-elected in the 2006 and 2011 elections. From 1999 to 2004 he was Vice-Chair of the Political Commission on the Party. In June 2004 he presided the organizing committee for the XXII National Congress of the Party, at which he was elected to the national Political Steering Committee. He served as the President of the Congress from 2008 to 2009. From March 2010 to July 2017, he served as Chairman of the party's Political Commission. He was reelected for a fifth term in Congress at the 2016 elections under the Popular Alliance

His final tenure in office ended with the dissolution of Congress by Martín Vizcarra. He served a total of 23 years in Congress.

Congress President 
Thanks to his outstanding parliamentary work, Congressman Velásquez was entrusted by his party to run for the presidency of Congress for the annual period of sessions 2008 - 2009, competing with the opposition Víctor Andrés García Belaúnde of the Parliamentary Alliance, whom he won with a vote of 66 votes to 46 for Belaunde, electing him head of the National Congress.

The Board of Directors chaired by Velásquez was made up of Alejandro Aguinaga —First Vice President (Lambayeque) - Álvaro Gutiérrez —Second Vice President (Arequipa) - and Fabiola Morales (Piura), this was a purely provincial list, after so many years directed by Lima parliamentarians and that many of the objectives proposed by this parliamentary conformation was to achieve a reinforcement of the decentralization process in Peru so many times put in the background by centralism.

As President of Parliament, Velásquez held decentralized sessions in different cities of the country in order to consolidate the decentralization process, taking the seat of parliament to the interior of the country.

Premiership

On 11 July 2009, President Alan García named him as prime minister during the controversy surrounding indigenous clashes with the government when 34 people died. He was sworn-in at 8:00 pm on 12 July 2009. The appointment of Velásquez, considered a party loyalist, was seen by pundits as an attempt by García to tighten his grip on power for his final term. It is considered a reversal after appointing the leftist Yehude Simon, Velásquez's predecessor.  Velásquez is the third person to hold the office in nine months. Garcia, whose approval rating was 21 percent, also replaced the ministers of defense, justice, agriculture and the interior. He resigned his post in September 2010 with the intention to run for the Peruvian Aprista Party presidential nomination later that year. Although not selected as the nominee, he was part of the presidential ticket of Mercedes Aráoz in which he was the candidate for First Vice President until her withdrawal from the election in January 2011.

Party insider

Velásquez is considered a governing party insider, having served in Congress for 23 years. He is thought to be an adept negotiator with a powerful rhetoric in defense of his leader Alan García.

References

External links

Official Congressional Site
Presentation on the Peruvian Aprista Party site
Resume on the National Electoral Panel (JNE) site

|-

Living people
1959 births
American Popular Revolutionary Alliance politicians
Members of the Congress of the Republic of Peru
Presidents of the Congress of the Republic of Peru
Prime Ministers of Peru
Government ministers of Peru
Pontifical Catholic University of Peru alumni
Academic staff of the University of San Martín de Porres
People from Lambayeque Region